Wilhelmus Frederik van Leeuwen (18 April 1860 – 6 September 1930) was a Dutch politician and Mayor of Amsterdam between 1901 and 1910. Born in The Hague, he studied at the University of Amsterdam and led the student union there. Leaving with a law doctorate, he moved to Amsterdam to practice law. As well as being the mayor of Amsterdam, he was the first Vice-President of the Council of State to not be a member of the nobility.

1860 births
1930 deaths
King's and Queen's Commissioners of North Holland
Mayors of Amsterdam
Politicians from The Hague